Last Hope, also named Unit Pandora, is a Japanese-Chinese anime television series produced and animated by Satelight. It is created and directed by Shōji Kawamori alongside Hidekazu Sato and written by Toshizo Nemoto. It premiered online in Netflix in Japan on March 29, 2018 with a local televised broadcast on Tokyo MX and its affiliate stations on April 4, 2018. A worldwide release through Netflix went online on September 15, 2018.

Plot
The series takes place in the year 2038, seven years after the Xianglong Crisis when a quantum reactor exploded and caused a chain reaction that destroyed civilization. It also spurred a rapid evolutionary process that turned most animals into bio-mechanical creatures called BRAI (Biological Revolutionary of Accelerated Intellect), that gradually become a threat to humanity as the city of Neo-Xianglong establish the creation of MOEV (Multi-purpose Organic Evolution Vehicle) mecha to fend off the BRAI. Leon Lau, a scientist previously exiled from Neo-Xianglong for his role in the Xianglong Crisis, provides a stable quantum reactor called the Hyper Drive to enable the MOEV of the established Pandora Unit to combat a series of BRAI that are being enhanced by a similar device created by the mysterious Sieg.

Characters

 A brilliant yet eccentric scientist under Lon Woo who was a central figure in the Xianglong Crisis, spending five years in the wilderness in exile outside Neo Xianglong before being allowed to return as a member of the Pandora Unit.

 Her real name , she was adopted by Leon as his "little sister" after her brother died and followed him in his banishment from Neo Xianglong. Although they are not related by blood, she thinks of Leon like a big brother while establishing rules in their family contract to keep him in line.

 A sniper who loves women and cats, Doug was finishing an assignment in Xianglong when the "Xianglong Crisis" struck and turned his life into a tragedy. Seven years later, Doug works as a bounty hunter before being hired to join the Pandora Unit. Although he is a friendly and talkative "mood-maker", when looking down the scope of his rifle, Doug has the cold eyes of a beast which played in his code name "Eye of the Tiger".

 Having lost her parents at a young age, Queenie Yoh was adopted by the master of dojo in the mountains where she trained in the "Sky God Fist" style of martial arts. Following the "Xianglong Crisis" struck, Queenie was unable to prevent Hao Wang from murdering their master and fellow students, having since became a bounty hunter to track him down before joining the Pandora Unit.

Gren Din is one of the main character in Last Hope. He is also a member of the special unit Pandora.

Cain Ibrahim Hasan is the mayor's bodyguard. He later becomes commander of the special unit Pandora.

Cecile Sue is the mayor of Neo Xianglong. Cecile has green eyes and shoulders length dove gray hair tied in a ponytail.

Jay has long charcoal colored hair with a single red streak on the front right side.

 The antagonist for the first half of the series, seeking to destroy Xianglong out of animosity towards Cecile and her family for forcing his father Edgar and their clan to submit. He later merges himself into a centipede BRAI that he enhanced by feeding it the bones of his ancestors, whose bones were infused with chaos influenced water, and is destroyed by Leon in the Pandora 1.

 The series antagonist who first offered his services to Mr. Gold by providing him with the means to attack Neo Xianglong. He is later revealed to be an entity that came into being during the "Xianglong Crisis" from a convergence of alternate versions of Lon Woo, initially possessing Lon Woo before creating his own body after his original self's death.

 A martial artist and practitioner of the "Sky God Fist" style of martial arts, believing that might justifies the means following the "Xianglong Crisis". This mind set inspired him to murder his mentor and most of his peers, sparing Queenie as he believes she would be an ideal opponent to face later. Wang offers his services and that of his falcon BRAI pet to Mr. Gold in order to force Queenie to release her full potential via the Hyperdrive.

 A cyborg assassin loyal to Mr. Gold whose body got heavily damaged around the time of his employer's demise. Fau survived by merging himself with a dog BRAI and tries to kill a hospitalized Cecile, only to fail and get obliterated.

 A scientist who oversaw the experiment that caused the "Xianglong Crisis" and claimed his life, later revealed to have been influenced by Sieg in his final days.

 A mysterious girl who is Cecile's sister, appearing before her and Leon.

 (Japanese)

 A scientist from Doug's past.

Media

Manga
A prequel manga adaptation and a 4-panel spinoff were announced. The prequel manga, titled Jūshinki Pandora 0, is serialized on Pixiv's website.

Anime
On October 17, 2017, it was announced that Shoji Kawamori's latest project had been revealed to be an original TV anime. The series is directed by Shoji Kawamori and Hidekazu Sato and features animation by Satelight. Toshizo Nemoto is writing the series. Risa Ebata provides character designs for the series. The opening theme is "Sirius" and the ending theme is "Spica"; both are performed by Bump of Chicken. The songs "New Generation" and "Meteor" by Shiena Nishizawa and the song  by Megumi Nakajima are used as insert themes in the series.

Notes

References

External links
 

Anime with original screenplays
Kodansha manga
Light novels
Media Factory
Netflix original anime
Satelight
Shōnen manga
Yonkoma
Mecha anime and manga
Tokyo MX original programming